Brome-Missisquoi may refer to:

Brome-Missisquoi Regional County Municipality, Quebec
Brome—Missisquoi, a federal electoral district
Brome-Missisquoi (provincial electoral district), a provincial electoral district